During the handpress era (roughly 1450–1800), and especially in the 16th century, the Southern Netherlands (corresponding largely to what is now Belgium) was an international centre for the printing of books and images. There were printers in many of the towns, and some towns had many printers.

The laws of Charles V required all printers and booksellers to acquire a license in order to exercise their trade, a requirement that was in place through the subsequent period of Spanish rule. His son, Philip II of Spain, further ordered that the Antwerp printers enrol with the Guild of St Luke, adding another layer of control. The business records of one of the most important printing houses of the era, the Plantin Office in Antwerp, have remained intact, and are now the archive of the Plantin-Moretus Museum. As a result, the records of who was involved in printing are extremely accessible to historians and have been much studied.

This list is arranged alphabetically by town. Booksellers or print publishers who did not own a printing press but who commissioned printing under their own name are included. Some of the dates given are approximate. As of January 2015 the list is largely limited to printers who were active at some point during the rule of the Archdukes Albert and Isabella (1598–1621).

Antwerp
Antwerp was the most important centre of printing in the Spanish Netherlands and had the best connections with international markets. The following printers and booksellers were active in Antwerp.
 Andreas Bacx, active 1578–1614
 Anthoni Ballo, active 1591–1618
 Balthazar Bellerus, active 1589; moved to Douai, active 1590–1634
 Joannes Bellerus, active 1553–1595
 Widow of Joannes Bellerus (Elisabeth Commers), active 1595–1616
 Lucas Bellerus, active 1574–1600
 Petrus Bellerus, active 1562–1600
 Gilles Beys, active 1590–1594; moved to Paris, active 1594–1595
 Jacob Bosselaer, active 1595–1608
 Peter de Cater, active 1585–1598; moved to Amsterdam, active 1601–1612
 François de Cauwe, active 1594–1610
 Hendrik de Clerck, active 1585–1597
 Joannes Cnobbaert, active 1620–1637
 Widow of Joannes Cnobbaert (Maria de Man), active 1637–1664
 Michiel Cnobbaert, active 1657–1689
 Hieronymus Cock, active 1548–1570
 Arnout Coninx, active 1579–1617
 Gillis Coppens van Diest, active 1573–1609
 Volcxken Diericx, active 1551–1600
 Gaspard Fleysben, active 1588
 Widow of John Fowler, active 1579–1586; moved to Douai, active 1586–1602
 Philip Galle, active 1564–1612
 Jan (III) van Ghelen, active 1577–1598; moved to Maastricht, active 1598–1605; moved to Rotterdam, active 1606–1610
 Joannes Grapheus, active 1520–1569
 Claes de Grave, active 1511–1540
 Michiel Hillen van Hoochstraten, c. 1476–1558
 Marten Huyssens, active 1582–1620
 Guislain Janssens, active 1587–1619
 Cornelis De Jode, active 1591–1600
 Gerard de Jode, active 1547–1591
 Jan van Keerbergen, active 1586–1624
 Merten de Keyser / Martin Lempereur, active 1525–1536
 Widow of Merten de Keyser, active 1536–1541
 Widow of Peter van Keerbergen, active 1592–1594
 Willem Lesteens, active 1612–1654
 Mynken Liefrink, active 1567–1593
 Hans van Liesvelt, active 1545–1564
 Jacob van Liesvelt, active 1513–1544
 Widow of Jacob van Liesvelt, active 1546–1566
 Herman Mersman, active 1572–1591
 Jacob Mesens, active 1592–1625
 Mattheus Mesens, active 1581–1595
 Gauthier Morberius, active 1553–1555; moved to Liège, active 1558–1595
 Jan Moretus, active 1589–1610
 François de Nus, active 1592–1593
 Martinus Nutius, father, son and grandson, active 1540–1638
 Philippus Nutius (printer), active 1564—1586
 Abraham Ortelius, active 1547–1598
 Widow of Willem van Parijs, active 1586–1595
 Petrus Phalesius the Elder, active 1581–1629
 Christopher Plantin, active 1548–1589
 Guillaume Rivière, active 1575–1584; moved to Arras, active 1591–1627
 Gerard Rivius, active 1598; moved to Leuven, active 1598–1625
 Mattheus van Roye, active 1560–1591
 Thomas Ruault, active 1591–1592
 Anthonis Spierinckx, active 1584–1616
 Gillis Steelsius, active 1570–1610
 Pauwels Stroobant, active 1596–1617
 Willem Stroobant, active 1592–1595 and 1610–1617; moved to Lille, active 1596–1598
 Gommarus Sulsenius, active 1594–1625
 Hendrik Swingen, active 1587–1601
 Ameet Tavernier, active 1583–1593
 Artus Tavernier, active 1580; moved to Salamanca, active 1604–1615
 Antheunis Thielens, active 1564–1596
 Peter van Tongheren, active 1580–1602
 Caesar Joachim Trognaesius, active 1624–1645
 Joachim Trognaesius, active 1583–1620
 Hieronymus Verdussen, active 1579–1635
 Abraham Verhoeven, active 1605–1632
 Daniel Vervliet, active 1564–1610
 Widow of Jan Verwithagen, active 1588–1592
 Jan Verwithagen the younger, active 1588–1599
 Willem Vorsterman, active 1504–1542
 Jan Baptist Vrients, active 1575–1611
 Gerard van Wolschaten, active 1596–1634
 Hendrik Wouters, active 1571–1592

Ath
 Joannes Masius le jeune, active 1590–1622

Bruges
 Nicolaes Breyghel, active 1624–1663
 Hubrecht Croock, active 1520–1554
 Widow of Hubrecht Croock (Catharina de Bondue), active 1554–1557
 Anthonis Janssuene, active 1584–1619

Brussels
 Hubert Anthoon, active 1598–1630
 Widow of Michiel van Hamont, active 1585–1587
 Pierre de La Tombe, active 1558–1595
 Jan Mommaert, active 1585–1627
 Jean Pepermans, active 1620–1633
 Robrecht Phalesius, active 1577–1595
 Jan Reyns, active 1598–1609
 Pieter Simons, active 1598–1610
 Jean Thimon, active 1573–1609
 Rutger Velpius, active 1585–1614

Douai
 Balthazar Bellerus, active 1590–1634
 Jean Bogard, active 1572–1627
 John Fowler, active 1577–1578
 Widow of John Fowler, active 1586–1602
 John Heigham, active 1603–1613; moved to St Omer, active 1613–1634
 Laurence Kellam, active 1604–1613
 John Lion, active 1580–1603

Ghent
 Joos vanden Kerckhove, active 1595–1604
 Gauthier Manilius, active 1574–1626
 Jan van Salensen, active 1580–1623
 Jan van den Steene, active 1576–1625
 Joos vander Straeten, active 1606–1610

Kortrijk
 Joos vander Straeten, active 1592–1606; moved to Ghent, active 1606–1610

Leuven
 Joannes Bogardus, active 1556–1567; moved to Douai, active 1572–1627
 Franciscus Fabri, active 1590–1605
 John Fowler, active 1565–1574; moved to Douai, active 1577–1578
 Jacob Heyberghs, active 1567–1596
 Laurence Kellam, active 1597–1600; moved to Valenciennes, active 1601–1603; moved to Douai, active 1604–1613
 John Lion, active 1579–1580; moved to Douai, active 1580–1603
 Joannes Masius the elder, active 1567–1616
 Pierre Phalèse the Elder, active 1545–1575
 Pierre Phalèse the Younger, active 1570–1578; moved to Antwerp, active 1581–1629
 Gerard Rivius, active 1598–1625
 Andreas Sassenus, active 1557–1610
 Servatius Sassenus, active 1557–1596
 Rutger Velpius, active 1565–1580; moved to Mons, active 1580–1584; moved to Brussels, active 1585–1614
 Nicolaes Wouters, active 1595–1598
 Joannes Baptista Zangrius, active 1595–1599
 Petrus Zangrius, active 1585–1610
 Jacobus Zegers, active 1631–1644

Liège
 Arnold de Corswarem, active 1598–1632
 Jean de Glen, active 1597–1631
 Jacques Grégoire, active 1595–1596
 Pierre de Heer, active 1581–1594
 Henricus Hovius, active 1567–1611
 Nicolas Ingelbert, active 1587–1609
 Lambert de La Coste, active 1589–1609
 Gauthier Morberius, active 1558–1595
 Jasper Ostreman, active 1594
 Christian Ouwerx the elder, active 1581–1612
 Gerard Rivius, active 1592–1597; moved to Antwerp, active 1598; moved to Leuven, active 1598–1625
 Léonard Streel, active 1593–1653
 Jean Voes, active 1590–1599
 Widow of Jean Voes, active 1599–1601

Lier
 Pieter Simons, active 1616–1617

Lille
 Christophe Beys, active 1610–1645
 Pierre de Rache, active 1612–1648
 Pieter Simons, active 1589–1598; moved to Brussels, active 1598–1610
 Willem Stroobant, active 1596–1598; moved to Antwerp, active 1610–1617
 Antoine Tack, active 1594–1595

Luxembourg
 Hubertus Reulandt, active 1618–1639; moved to Trier, active 1640–1661

Mechelen
 Jan van Campenhout, active 1585–1643
 Henry Jaye, active 1617–1639

Mons
 Charles Michel, active 1579–1627
 Rutger Velpius, active 1580–1584; moved to Brussels, active 1585–1614

Namur
 François Vivien, active 1597–1628

St Omer
 English College Press, 1607–1759
 John Heigham, active 1613–1634

Tournai
 Nicolas Laurent, active 1580–1617

Sources
 Fernand Danchin, Les Imprimés lillois: Répertoire bibliographique de 1594 à 1815, vol. 1 (Lille, 1926)
 Jules Houdoy, Les Imprimeurs lillois: Bibliographie des impressions lilloises, 1595–1700 (Paris, 1879; reprinted Geneva, 1971)
 Frans M. A. Robben, Jan Poelman, boekverkoper en vertegenwoordiger van de firma Plantin-Moretus in Salamanca, 1579–1607 (Antwerp, 1994)
 Anne Rouzet, Dictionnaire des imprimeurs, libraires et éditeurs des XVe et XVIe siècles dans les limites géographiques de la Belgique actuelle (Nieuwkoop, 1975)
 Leon Voet, The Golden Compasses: The History of the House of Plantin-Moretus (2 vols., Amsterdam, London and New York, 1969–1972)
 General Willems, Le Livre, l'estampe, l'édition en Brabant du XVe au XIXe siècle (Gembloux, 1935)

References

Lists of 16th-century people
Belgium history-related lists
Lists of Belgian people by occupation
Lists of mass media in Belgium
Lists of 17th-century people